The New Mutants is an original graphic novel published in 1982 by Marvel Comics, introducing the superhero team the New Mutants.  The fourth issue of Marvel Graphic Novel, it was written by Chris Claremont and illustrated by Bob McLeod.

Plot summary
Five young mutants who are just starting to learn about their powers.  All of them have a tragic past. Wolfsbane is hunted and shot while fleeing Reverend Craig, but is saved by Moira MacTaggert. Roberto da Costa turns into Sunspot when he is attacked by a racist during a soccer game. Cannonball discovers his powers when a mine collapses on him, and Danielle Moonstar's grandfather, Black Eagle, is killed by the Hellfire Club. 
 
Much later back at Charles Xavier's school, Xavier's School for Gifted Youngsters, Wolfsbane and Karma are taken in by the school and Xavier gets a letter from Black Eagle about Moonstar's mutant powers. He leaves immediately only to find out Black Eagle is dead. He does, however, save Moonstar. They then go and find Sunspot, who they correctly think will be the next target. 
 
When they get to Brazil and find Sunspot he is being forced to give himself up in order to save the life of his kidnapped girlfriend, Juliana Sandoval. Karma and Moonstar try to help, but Juliana dies saving Sunspot's life. The four young mutants then go to Donald Pierce, who has been behind all the murders and who has also recently kidnapped Xavier and tricked Cannonball into working for him. 
 
The battle ensues, but the young mutants are victorious and even Wolfsbane heals from her severe wounds. Back at Xavier's school, all the New Mutants but Cannonball don their new uniforms. What they don't know is that Cannonball is just arriving and, despite their initial meeting, the New Mutants choose to accept him as part of the group.

References

1982 graphic novels
1982 comics debuts
Books by Chris Claremont
Comics by Chris Claremont
Superhero graphic novels
Marvel Comics graphic novels
New Mutants